The Counter-Terrorist Unit (abbr. ПTJ / PTJ) was a police tactical unit of the Serbian Police. The PTJ was initially established within the Gendarmery of the Police and in April 2007 was made an independent unit within the Police Directorate of the Police.

As its name states, the PTJ was oriented towards anti-terror operations as well as securing and maintaining the internal security of Serbia. Often only used in operations deemed too dangerous for other police units, it was highly trained and equipped. The PTJ's responsibilities included: resolving hostage situations, anti-terrorist operations, high-profile arrests and bomb disposal. Members of the PTJ operate with extreme professionalism and devotion to their responsibilities. This has earned the PTJ the great respect throughout the world as an elite special operations police unit among other such units. In 2016, the unit was disbanded and most of its members were incorporated into the Special Anti-Terrorist Unit (SAJ).

Equipment and training

Candidates were selected from the Žandarmerija, who underwent rigorous physical evaluations before tactical training could begun. Lieutenant Colonel Dragović, the commander, stated in 2007 that out of 150 candidates only eight were selected in that year. Members of the PTJ were expected to meet and excel the criteria set before them. Trainees were exposed to varying conditions that they might find in real life operations. PTJ training centres were located at Petrovo Selo near Kula and Goč near Vrnjačka Banja.

Weapons used include:
CZ 99
Glock 17
Beretta Px4 Storm 
Zastava M70
M4 carbine
SIG Sauer SIG516
Heckler & Koch MP5
Heckler & Koch UMP
FAMAS
DDR MpikM (AKM) rifle

Publicly known operations
In 13 operations across eight cities in Serbia, the PTJ arrested numerous members of the so-called "Customs Mafia". They detained known organized crime leaders such as Sreten Jocić from the Netherlands; Dejan Milenković from Greece; Ridvan Rašitija from Switzerland; and extradited Abdelmajid Bouchar, (a member of "Al-Qaeda" suspected in connection with the 2004 Madrid train bombings), to Spain.

Others:
2007 - Arrested a large group of terrorists in an Islamic religious movement called the wahhabi on Mount Ninaja, killing one.
2009 - Hostage rescue in Jagodina (in central Serbia).

See also
 Special Anti-Terrorist Unit

References

External links

 Ministry of Internal Affairs
 

Law enforcement in Serbia
Special forces of Serbia
Non-military counterterrorist organizations
Law enforcement units